Prior to and during the second world war the US Army called several tractors M1 Medium Tractor. Under the Ordnance Corps these "off the shelf" tractors were meant to tow artillery pieces, so were not equipped with blades like their Engineer counterparts. Eventually these were replaced by purpose built "High Speed Tractors" (HST). Some tractors were equipped with crane attachments for ammunition, and material handling.

Tractors
 Caterpillar model 30
 Caterpillar model 35
 Allis-Chalmers HD-7W.
 Allis-Chalmers Monarch k35
 Cletrac model 35
 Caterpillar model Caterpillar RD6
 Caterpillar D6
 Cletrac model BC, w/angle dozer
 Allis-Chalmers WM
 G-132: a) M1 medium tractor TD-14, b) M3 tractor crane, 2-Ton, International Harvester TD14

Gallery

Detailed information on Allis-Chalmers, Model WM
Engine: Allis-Chalmers WM. Gasoline. 4-cylinder 
Fuel tank: 24 gallons 
gearbox: Four speeds forward, one reverse. 
Length: 
Width: 
Height: 
Working weight:

See also
 M1 Heavy Tractor
 M1 Light Tractor
 M2 Light Tractor
 List of U.S. military vehicles by model number
 List of U.S. military vehicles by supply catalog designation

References
 TM 9-783B Manual Allis-Chalmers HD-7W
 TM 9-1783A A-C HD-7W Diesel engine.
 TM 9-1783B (coming soon)
 TM 9-1783C
 TM 5-3272 IHC TD-14

Military vehicles of the United States